An insider is a member of a group of people of limited number and with restricted access.

Insider(s) or The Insider(s) may also refer to:

Arts, entertainment, and media

Comics
 Insiders, a comic series by Mark Millar and Paul Grist, published in Crisis
 The Insiders, a team of DC Comics characters in the Brainiac stories
 Insiders (Dargaud), a French graphic novel series by Jean-Claude Bartoll, published by Dargaud

Literature
The Insider (Latynina novel), a 1999 novel by Russian author Yulia Latynina
The Insider (Rao novel), a 1998 roman à clef by former Indian Prime Minister P. V. Narasimha Rao
The Insider, a 1999 novel by American author Stephen Frey
The Insider: The Private Diaries of a Scandalous Decade, a 2005 book by British media personality Piers Morgan

Music
 "Insider", a song from Tom Petty & The Heartbreakers' 1981 album Hard Promises
 Insiders (band), a Chicago-based rock band active in the 1980s and 1990s
 Insider (album), a 2006 album by Manchester alternative rock band Amplifier

Periodicals
The Insider (website), an independent Russian investigative online newspaper
The Insider (newsletter), a newsletter reporting on Pennsylvania politics
The Insider, a magazine published by the Heritage Foundation
Business Insider, a business news website owned by Insider, Inc.
 Insider, a news website dedicated to reviews, and lifestyle.
 Insider, Inc., an online media company known for publishing Insider, Business Insider, and other media websites
The Insider (news website), a Ugandan news website

Television

Series
 Insider (Philippine TV program), a 2012 Philippine documentary and investigative program that aired on News5
 Insiders (Australian TV program), an Australian news and politics analysis television program that debuted on ABC in 2001
 Insiders (British TV series), a 1997 British television drama series
 ABS-CBN Insider, a 2003 Philippine news program
 The Insider (TV program), a 2004–2017 American tabloid reality television news program that aired in syndication
 The Insiders (TV series), a 1985—1986 American television detective series
 The Insiders, a South Korean web cartoon by Yoon Tae-ho
 Insiders (Spanish TV series), a Spanish reality television series
 Insider (South Korean TV series), a 2022 television series

Episodes 
 "The Insider" (Law & Order: Criminal Intent), a 2002 episode of the American television crime drama Law & Order: Criminal Intent
 "Insiders" (Stargate SG-1), a tenth-season episode of the science fiction television series Stargate SG-1

Other uses in arts, entertainment, and media
IGN Insider, a subscription web service later renamed IGN Prime
Insider Inc., an American online media company
 The Insider (film), a 1999 drama about a 60 Minutes exposé of the tobacco industry

Computing and technology
Intel Insider, a form of digital copy protection and digital rights management for integrated graphics processors
Windows Insider, an open software testing program from Microsoft

Other uses
 The Insiders (professional wrestling), a WCW tag team of Diamond Dallas Page and Kevin Nash
 Insider trading, trading of a public company's stock or other securities based on material, nonpublic information